Xiangcheng District is a district and the seat of the city of Xiangyang, Hubei province, People's Republic of China.

History

Xiangcheng District is the location of the old urban core of Xiangyang, south of the Han River.

Administrative divisions
Six subdistricts:
Zhenwushan Subdistrict, Gucheng Subdistrict, Panggong Subdistrict, Tanxi Subdistrict, Longzhong Subdistrict, Yujiahu Subdistrict

Two towns:
Oumiao, Wolong

The only township is Yinji Township

Former subdistricts:
Wangfu Subdistrict, Zhaoming Subdistrict

References

Xiangyang